The 2017–18 Israeli Noar Premier League was the 24th season since its introduction in 1994 as the top-tier football in Israel for teenagers between the ages 18–20, and the 7th under the name Noar Premier League.

League table

Results

Positions by round
The table lists the positions of teams after each week of matches. In order to preserve chronological evolvements, any postponed matches are not included to the round at which they were originally scheduled, but added to the full round they were played immediately afterwards. For example, if a match is scheduled for matchday 13, but then postponed and played between days 16 and 17, it will be added to the standings for day 17.

Source: Noar Premier League IFA

References

External links
 Noar Premier League IFA 

Israeli Noar Premier League seasons
Youth